The Dumpas are an indigenous ethnic group residing in Sabah, Malaysia. They reside in the kampung Rancangan Nangoh  and Perancangan villages in Labuk-Suguut Subdistrict of Sandakan Division. Their population was estimated at 1,078 in the year 2000. Their language (ISO 639-3 dmv) belongs to the Paitanic branch of the Austronesian language family. The language is dying out as a result of intermarriage with other groups, and since native speakers also use Tambanuo in their daily conversation.

References

Ethnic groups in Sabah
Kadazan-Dusun people